Red Dragon is a 1965 West German-Italian spy film directed by Ernst Hofbauer and starring Stewart Granger, Rosanna Schiaffino, and Margit Saad. It was released in Germany as Das Geheimnis der drei Dschunken and  A 009 missione Hong Kong in Italy. It was released in the United States as a double feature with Lightning Bolt by Woolner Brothers in 1967 under the title Code Name Alpha.

The film's sets were designed by the art director Max Mellin. It was shot on location in Hong Kong.

The film is a remake of the French spy film The River of Three Junks (1957).

Plot
In a Hong Kong park, a man brushes against the arm of a girl sitting on a bench, and she slips to the ground, murdered. Immediately afterward, the man is killed also. It turns out the woman was connected with a jewel-smuggling ring, and the man was a federal agent. FBI agent Michael Scott is given the assignment and finds a way to sneak agent Carol into the smuggling gang. Carol goes to work for Pierre Milot, who works for the smugglers.

Cast

References

Bibliography

External links
 
Red Dragon at TCMDB

1965 films
West German films
1960s German-language films
1960s spy thriller films
1965 adventure films
German spy thriller films
German adventure films
Italian spy thriller films
Italian adventure films
1960s multilingual films
Films set in Hong Kong
Films set in San Francisco
Remakes of French films
Italian remakes of French films
Italian multilingual films
German multilingual films
Constantin Film films
Films directed by Ernst Hofbauer
1960s English-language films
1960s Italian films
1960s German films